Gilanne Louwaars is a Dutch former football midfielder who played for SV Saestum in the Hoofdklasse and FC Utrecht in the Eredivisie. She also played the European Cup with Saestum, and she was a member of the Dutch national team. She scored three goals in the 2007 World Cup qualifying including a winner over Austria.

International goals
Scores and results list the Netherlands goal tally first.

References

1979 births
Living people
Dutch women's footballers
Netherlands women's international footballers
FC Utrecht (women) players
Eredivisie (women) players
People from Nieuwegein
Women's association football midfielders
SV Saestum players
Footballers from Utrecht (province)